The 2018–2019 season was Željezničar's 98th in existence and their 19th season in the Premijer Liga BiH. The team competed in the Premijer Liga BiH, Kup BiH and the UEFA Europa League.

The club finished on 4th place in the league, while it got knocked out from the cup in the first round. In the season, Željezničar primarily also qualified to the 2019–20 UEFA Europa League qualifying rounds, but the club didn't get an UEFA licence and eventually, 5th placed FK Radnik Bijeljina got qualified.

Squad information

Players

Disciplinary record
Includes all competitive matches. The list is sorted by position, and then shirt number.

Squad statistics

Goalscorers

Last updated: 25 May 2019

Assists

Last updated: 25 May 2019

Clean sheets

Last updated: 25 May 2019

Transfers

Players in 

 
 
 
 
 
 
 
 
 

Total expenditure:  €0

Players out 

 
 

 
 
 
 
 
 
 

Total income:  €600,000
Net:  €600,000

Club

Coaching staff
{|
|valign="top"|

Other information

Sponsorship

Competitions

Pre-season

Mid-season

Overall

Premijer Liga BiH

Regular season table

Results summary

Results by round

Matches

Kup BiH

Round of 32

UEFA Europa League

First qualifying round

Second qualifying round

References

FK Željezničar Sarajevo seasons
Zeljeznicar